The Hondo River or Río Hondo is a river of Central America, approximately  long, which flows in a northeasterly direction to discharge into Chetumal Bay on the Caribbean Sea. Most of the international border between the nations of Mexico and Belize runs along its length.

The river is formed from the confluences of several upper tributaries, such as Blue Creek and Chan Chich (Rio Bravo) which have their sources in Guatemala's Petén Basin region, and Booth's River which originates in the western Belizean district of Orange Walk. These tributaries join to form the Hondo River near the settlements of Blue Creek Village, on the Belizean side, and La Unión on the Mexican side. The river continues its northeastern course with few other settlements along its length until reaching its outlet in Chetumal Bay. The city of Chetumal, capital of the Mexican state of Quintana Roo and the region's main port, lies close to this outlet.

Several archaeological sites of the pre-Columbian Maya civilization are located near the river's course.

The river is mentioned in a stanza of Belize's national anthem, Land of the Free:
...
Our fathers, the Baymen, valiant and bold
Drove back the invader; this heritage hold
From proud Rio Hondo to old Sarstoon,
Through coral isle, over blue lagoon;
...

References

External links 

 Map showing location

Geography of Mesoamerica
Rivers of Belize
International rivers of North America
Belize–Mexico border
Rivers of Quintana Roo
Border rivers